Matriarchy Now is the debut mixtape by Russian feminist protest and performance art group Pussy Riot. It was released on 5 August 2022 through Neon Gold Records.

Track listing
All tracks are produced by Gold Glove except where noted.

References

2022 mixtape albums
Debut mixtape albums
Pussy Riot